Football Follies are collections of American football bloopers performed by National Football League players. Produced by NFL Films, these collections also spoof parts of popular culture. Mel Blanc joined in the fun in 1976 with The Son of Football Follies, and returned (in one of his final efforts) in 1989 for The Super Duper Football Follies. In addition, Jonathan Winters was featured in 1987's The NFL TV Follies, intended as a parody of the relationship between football and television.

The series of films currently airs on NFL Network, usually as filler programming when a live game is airing on another network (most commonly Sunday or Monday Night Football).

Best of the Football Follies 
In 1985, NFL Films released The Best of the Football Follies,  a look back at some of the series' highlights. This special features two new segments: The story of two teams whose history was filled with follies - the 1976 Tampa Bay Buccaneers and the lovable losers the New Orleans Saints, who had gone 78-203 in their history with only two seasons at .500 (both teams would win Super Bowls in the decades following the special); the special also included outtakes from the NFL's Best Ever Coaches (produced in 1981), focusing on head coaches (notably Dick Vermeil during the 1980 NFC Championship Game and Hank Stram at Super Bowl IV) who were wired for sound.

100 Greatest Follies 
In 1994, as part of NFL Films' celebration of NFL's 75th anniversary, 100 Greatest Follies counted down the 100 greatest bloopers in NFL history, chosen, according to the video's promotion, by a "secret ballot" at NFL Films. The 100 follies shown, with the exception of follies 1-10, were not shown in numerical order, but were categorized by how certain follies related to different topics. The list of the categories were as follows:

 "It Made History" - Follies that made an impact on the NFL, whether it was through team strategy, the NFL's rulebook, or the record books.
 "What Were They Thinking?" - Follies caused by the players' own lapse in judgment.
 "End Zone Antics" - Follies that happened either in or around the end zone.
 "The More The Merrier" - Follies where multiple players were involved.
 "Forever Young" - Follies where NFL quarterback Steve Young was involved, with Young himself providing insight into the follies.
 "With Friends Like These..." - Follies occurring to players that were caused by their own teammates.
 "Those Zany Saints" - Follies that were committed by the New Orleans Saints during their hapless years.
 "Kicking the Habit" - Follies that occurred to kickers and punters.
 "They Pay The Freight" -  Follies where the fans were involved.
 "Bermuda Triangle" - Follies that occurred on the sidelines.
 "The Dave Krieg Lifetime Achievement Award" - Follies that involved quarterback Dave Krieg, who was well known at the time for committing more fumbles than any other player in league history.
 "Strange But True" - Follies so strange that they were considered never able to happen again.
 "All's Well That Ends Well" - Follies that ended up turning out positive for the players or teams who perpetrated the folly.
 "The Top Ten" - The top 10 greatest follies in NFL history.

Other titles

Several imitators have surfaced in response to the original Football Follies, even in sports other than football. Below is a list of sequels and imitators, listed by year:

The Football Follies - 1968
Those Fantastic Football Follies - 1970
Son of Football Follies - 1976 - featuring voices by Mel Blanc
A Festival of Funnies - 1980 - includes a short set entirely to music about a boy who manages to score a touchdown on a team of older boys
The NFL Symfunny - 1980 - Sports fanatic Jack Nicholson played a behind the scenes part in making of this film.
NFL Follies Go Hollywood - 1983 - features a rare onscreen appearance by John Facenda
The Best of the Football Follies - 1985
The All New NFL Football Follies - 1986
The NFL TV Follies - 1987 - starring Jonathan Winters
The Super Duper Football Follies - 1989 - features cameo voices by Mel Blanc, one of his final works before his death that year.
Football Follies on Parade - 1990
Phenomenal Football Follies - 1990
Foul-ups, Fumbles & Follies - 1991
Football Card Follies - 1992 - Includes actual football cards' mistakes and errors.
100 Greatest Follies - 1994
NFL's Newest Follies - 1995 - hosted by Dom Irrera
Offsides - 1995 - A series that was aired on Comedy Central.
Best of NFL follies - 1996Talkin' Follies - 1997The Nfl All-Star Follies - 199921st Century Follies - 2000 - narrated by Sara MoonFootball Comedy - 2003Follies The Next Generation - 2005 - hosted by Nick BakayLegends of the follies - 2007NFL Top 10 Worst Teams - 2007 - Part of the NFL Top 10.2007 Fall follies - 2007 - Includes spoof of America's Game portraying the 2007 DolphinsNFL Top 10 Follies - 2009 - Also Part of the NFL Top 10.NFL New Year's Mis-tackular - 2009NFL Holiday Spectacular - 2011(Note: Titles in this list are licensed by the NFL.)''

References

NFL Films
1970s sports comedy films
American sports comedy films
1980s sports comedy films